Aranjanam / Araijan Kodi  (Malayalam: അരഞ്ഞാണം Tamil:அரைஞான் கயிறு) is a girdle-like ornament for the waist, worn around the waist by many south Indian adults and children. It is usually made of gold or silver, sometimes it may also be a red or black thread tied around the waist. Aranjanam are common among women and men in India south India. A traditional practice being followed even today by many women and men, it is believed wearing Aranjanam is considered as protection from negative energy.   In Kerala, almost all newborns irrespective of the religious affiliation get a waist chain. Although many boys generally abandon waist chains during their teenage years, but most girls continue to wear waist chains as adults.  In Tamil Nadu, it is known as 'Araijan Kodi'  and 'Aranjana Charadu' in Kerala , It is made of gold, silver, or thick thread in red or black and wears it under clothes and usually keeps it on all the time, even when nude. Aranjanam can also fasten the cloth on the waist, similar to women using it to secure the folds of a sari. Some parents also believe that it will safeguard against evil spirits. Although in India, many women and men continue to wear them as adults as well. A follower of Shiva is expected to wear a chain, with Rudrakshas strung in a white chain with one hundred beads, around the waist. In Lakshadweep a silver thread is worn by both men and women. 

Ancient Tamil people used it, mentioned in Tolkappiyam, Sangam literature describes the usage of Araijan by the words வெண்ஞான் (Venjan - made of silver) and பொன்ஞான் (Ponjan - made of gold). A village in Tamil Nadu was named after it called 'Venjan Kondaan' meaning one who wore Silver Araijan.

An Aranjanam is given to babies of both genders and all religious affiliations, particularly in south India, on the 28th day after the baby's birth, as part of a ceremony called Noolukettu in Kerala and Irupathettu in Tamil Nadu which the baby is given its name, its first jewellery, eye makeup and a meal of sweet porridge.

Aranjana Charadu 
Aranjana Charadu  (Malayalam: അരഞ്ഞാണ ചരട് Tamil: ரைஞாண் கயிறு Telugu: మొలతాడు) is a sacred thread that tied around the waist of men, women and children.  This is a traditional custom that has been followed from ages and it is believed tying the thread around the waist is the sign of protection from evil spirits. It is also believed wearing a black thread, one could stave off the evil effects,helps block evil eye and wearing red waist threads will help ward off evil effects of enemies. It also aids removal of evil effects of spirits. These traditional practice mainly being followed by Hindu and Muslim Community  in South India. Metals like silver or gold are also used. It is also often seen that many women and men in south india ties the thread around their waists with an amulet (Malayalam: ഏലസ്  Tamil: தாயத்து). In Tamil Nadu the thread called as Araignan Kayiru (Arana Kayiru).

According to Indian mythology, it is believed that one must never remain nude from birth till death and wearing a thread on waist the effect of nudity on body gets nullified. 

Also, in ancient people believed waist thread (Aranjana Charadu) have many health benefits such as promote growth of strong and healthy genitals prevents diseases like hernia ,helps in development of healthy bones, keep weight and waist size under control by improving digestion, and improve fertility.

Noolukettu 

In Kerala, this ceremony is performed on the 28th day after birth of the child, as this is the first time the nakshatram (star) of the child repeats according to the Malayalam calendar. During the ceremony, charadu (thread), one in black or red cotton and the other a chain in gold are intertwined and tied around the waist of the child - this is usually done by the father of the child. This thread is called 'Aranjanam'. The child's eyes are lined with mayye or kanmashi (Kohl). A black spot is placed on one cheek or asymmetrically on the forehead, to ward off the evil eyes. The father whispers the chosen Hindu name in the child's right ear three times while the left ear is covered with a betel leaf. This is then repeated with the left ear. A mixture of ghee (melted and clarified butter) and honey is given to the infant as a base for its various foods in the future.

See also
Jewellery of Tamil Nadu

References

Tamil culture
Jewellery of India
Types of jewellery